Evergestis sexmaculosus is a moth in the family Crambidae. It was described by Shōnen Matsumura in 1925. It is found in Russia.

References

Evergestis
Moths described in 1925
Moths of Asia